Embelia australiana is a climbing plant found in rainforests of eastern Australia.

References

Primulaceae
Plants described in 1892
Flora of New South Wales
Flora of Queensland
Taxa named by Ferdinand von Mueller